As C. N. Annadurai breath his last an interim ministry came in to existence, the election of M. Karunanidhi as the Leader of the Dravida Munnetra Kazhagam  Legislature Party the interim Council of Ministers headed by V. R. Nedunchezhiyan resigned on 10 February 1969 and the Governor appointed M. Karunanidhi as Chief Minister on 10 February 1969.

Cabinet ministers

References 

Dravida Munnetra Kazhagam
Tamil Nadu ministries
1960s in Tamil Nadu
1970s in Tamil Nadu
1969 establishments in Tamil Nadu
Cabinets established in 1969